Miss Universe Ireland is a national beauty pageant that has selected Ireland's representative to the Miss Universe pageant since 2002.

History
Beginning in 2002 Andrea Roche, who represented Ireland at Miss Universe 1998 in the United States, was the national director of Miss Universe in Ireland. Through the Andrea Roche Model agency, the contestants trained to be the next representative of Ireland at the contest. Between 2002 and 2015 the Andrea Roche era resulted in only one high-placed result in Miss Universe, in 2010, with Rozanna Purcell.

Missions
Through the organization, the winner is provided a platform based on her objectives for the year. She will serve as ambassador for the country of Ireland. She will be the face of beauty and fashion brands and bring awareness to social causes for the greater good of communities across Ireland.  Alongside The Miss Universe Ireland Organization, she will plan how to achieve her personal and professional goals on the national and global scale.

Formats
Personal Interview: Contestant's will be judged by their ability to articulate themselves. This is the opportunity for the judges to get to know who you are.
Swimwear competition: Each contestant will walk the runway during the swimsuit segment displaying her dedication to a healthy lifestyle.
Evening Gown competition: The judges and fans will see the contestants’ personal style as they walk the stage in their evening gown of choice. However, the exact design of the gown does not count towards the total score and instead the judges focus on how confidently each woman presents herself.

Notes

Controversies 
In 2009 it was reported that the pageant was sponsored by Educogym, a concept gym created by Tony Quinn. At the launch contestants were photographed wearing sashes emblazoned with the Educogym name and it was announced the winner would receive a year's membership. Co-host Lisa Fitzpatrick was reported as saying "If someone wants to read into angels then let them on and if someone else gets help from Tony Quinn's seminars then it can only be doing good for them" despite what many were calling a cult.

Miss Universe Ireland 2010
In 2010 Rozanna Purcell was offered a contract with Trump Model Management after the Miss Universe 2010 competition ended, and was offered additional contracts in Mexico and Colombia. She was then invited to judge at the Miss Venezuela 2010 pageant.

Titleholders

Miss Universe Ireland 

Miss Universe Ireland has started to send a Miss Ireland to Miss Universe from 1961. Before 2002 the winner of Miss Ireland went to Miss Universe. Started in 2002 the first annual Miss Universe Ireland has been held by Andrea Roche (former Miss Ireland 1998). The winner represents her country at Miss Universe pageant. In 2017 the Miss Universe license in Ireland had given to Brittany Mason (an american model and Moxie media productions). The pageant reruns as like as the motto "Deliver the title of Miss Universe to the Irish". On occasion, when the winner does not qualify (due to age) for either contest, a runner-up is sent.

Miss Ireland 1961-2001

References

External links
 Official website of Miss Universe Ireland

 
Miss Universe by country
Recurring events established in 1961
Irish awards